Nemanja Nenadić (born 2 January 1994) is a Serbian professional basketball player for Río Breogán of the Liga ACB.

Playing career 
Nenadić played for Slodes, Tamiš, Pirot, Vojvodina Srbijagas and Dunav, all of the Serbian League and Serbian B League. On 5 August 2017, Nenadić signed a three-year deal with Serbian club FMP. 

On 14 September 2018, Nenadić signed a three-year deal with Serbian powerhouse Crvena zvezda. On 23 September  2018, he made a debut for Crvena zvezda in the 2018 Adriatic Supercup Final against Budućnost VOLI.

On 21 July 2020, Nenadić signed a two-year contract with FMP. On 9 July 2021, he has signed with Stelmet Zielona Góra of the PLK.

On June 24, 2022, he signed with Río Breogán of the Spanish Liga ACB.

National team career
Nenadić was a member of the Serbian university basketball team that participates at the 2017 Summer Universiade in Taipei.

References

External links 
 Profile at eurobasket.com
 Profile at realgm.com

1994 births
Living people
ABA League players
Basket Zielona Góra players
Basketball players from Belgrade
Basketball League of Serbia players
CB Breogán players
KK Crvena zvezda players
OKK Dunav players
KK FMP players
KK Mega Basket players
KK Mladost Zemun players
KK Vojvodina Srbijagas players
KK Pirot players
KK Slodes players
KK Tamiš players
Point guards
Serbian expatriate basketball people in Poland
Serbian expatriate basketball people in Spain
Serbian men's basketball players
Shooting guards